The Cameroon national cricket team is the men's team that represents Cameroon in international cricket. The team is organised by the Cameroon Cricket Federation, which gained affiliate membership of the International Cricket Council (ICC) on 29 June 2007 and became an associate member in 2017. However, the national side did not make its debut until 2011, when it played in the 2011 Africa Division Three tournament in Ghana.

In April 2018, the ICC decided to grant full Twenty20 International (T20I) status to all its members. Therefore, all Twenty20 matches played between Cameroon and other ICC members since 1 January 2019 have been full T20I matches.

Squad
Cameroon announced squad for 2022 ACA Africa T20 Cup.
 Faustin Mpegna (c)
 Julien Abega (vc)
 Protais Abanda
 Roland Amah
 Abdoulaye Aminou (wk)
 Roger Antangana
 Alexis Balla
 Kulbhushan Jadhav
 Dipita Loic
 Appolinaire Mengoumou
 Narcisse Ndouteng
 Idriss Tchakou
 Alain Toube (wk)
 Bruno Toube

Records and Statistics 

International Match Summary — Cameroon
 
Last updated 9 December 2022

Twenty20 International 

 Highest team total: 146/8 v. Sierra Leone on 2 December 2022 at Gahanga International Cricket Stadium, Kigali.
 Highest individual score: 49, Bruno Toubé v. Sierra Leone on 2 December 2022 at Gahanga International Cricket Stadium, Kigali.
 Best individual bowling figures: 4/13, Alain Toubé v. Eswatini on 8 December 2022 at IPRC Cricket Ground, Kigali.

T20I record versus other nations

Records complete to T20I #1950. Last updated 9 December 2022.

See also
List of Cameroon Twenty20 International cricketers

References

Further reading

Cricket in Cameroon
National cricket teams
Cricket
Cameroon in international cricket